Grünhain Abbey in Grünhain in the Saxon Ore Mountains, which was built and run by Cistercians, existed from 1230 to 1536.Today only its ruins remain.

References

Further reading 
 Lothar Enderlein: Kloster Grünhain im Westerzgebirge. Schwarzenberg, Glückauf-Verlag, 1934
 Martin Märker: Das Zisterzienserkloster Grünhain im Erzgebirge. Frankfurt am Main, Verlag des Erzgebirgsverein, 1968
 Manfred Richter: Tatort Mittelalter - Akte St. Petri Schletta und der Grünhainer Mönch Feiner. Annaberg, Verlag BERGstraße / Günter Hirt, 2002

External links 
Grünhain Abbey as a digital model (Sächsisches Landesamt für Archäologie)

Religious buildings and structures completed in 1230
Cistercian monasteries in Germany
Ruins in Germany
Ruined abbeys and monasteries